Fleet Readiness Center West (FRCW) is located in Lemoore Station, California and is part of Naval Air Station Lemoore. It is a subsidiary of the Navy's Fleet Readiness Center Command

Responsibilities
FRC West provides quality intermediate and depot level aviation maintenance, component repair and logistics support  specializing in the world's premier strike fighter platform, the FA-18, including all type/model/series at all locations/detachments. The Aircraft Modification Line in Lemoore, California specializes in Phased Maintenance Intervals (PMI) and Aircraft Modifications (MODs) for the FA-18 platform and along with a Depot detachment in Fallon, Nevada perform In Service Repairs (ISR's) on all Navy type/model/series. In addition FRCW's detachments in Fort Worth, Fallon and China Lake provides support EA-6B, E-2, H-60, F-5, F-16, T-39, H-60, AH-1, EA-6B, AV-8 and C-130 platforms.

History
In 2015, Capt. Kenneth Brown, was removed from his post "due to a loss of confidence in his ability to lead FRC West", by Rear Adm. Paul Sohl, CO of Fleet Readiness Centers. In 2018, FRCW held a change of command for the CO, replacing Capt. Lehee with Capt. Washburn.

See also
Fleet Readiness Center East
Fleet Readiness Center Mid-Atlantic
Fleet Readiness Center Northwest
Fleet Readiness Center Southeast
Fleet Readiness Center Southwest
Fleet Readiness Center Western Pacific

References

2008 establishments in California
United States naval aviation
Fleet Readiness Centers
Buildings and structures in Kings County, California
Buildings and structures in California